Griquas (known as the Windhoek Draught Griquas for sponsorship reasons since April 2022) are a South African rugby union team that participates in the annual Currie Cup tournament. Their home ground is Griqua Park in Kimberley and they draw their players mostly from Northern Cape Province. They have won the Currie Cup three times – in 1899, 1911 and 1970 – and the Vodacom Cup a joint-record five times.

History

The rugby team was established in 1886 in the then British colony of Griqualand West. Five years later, during the 1891 British Lions tour to South Africa, Griqualand West played the British Lions in Kimberley. Although they lost 3–0, the British presented the team with the Currie Cup, as they thought that Griqualand West produced the best performance out of the provincial games on their tour. The Currie Cup became South Africa's domestic prize, and Griqualand West first won it in 1899. Griqualand West subsequently won the Currie Cup again in 1911. After the introduction of official annual championships in 1969, Griqualand West won the final the next season, defeating Northern Transvaal 11–9 to claim their third title. Since then, Griquas have not won the Currie Cup.

The majority of Griquas supporters hail from the Northern Cape province of South Africa, most notably in and around Kimberley, where the team plays their home games. Griquas are nicknamed the "Peacock Blues".

Current squad

The following players have been included so far in the Griquas squad for the 2023 Currie Cup Premier Division:

Finals results

Currie Cup

1 Western Province and Transvaal did not compete.

Vodacom Cup

External links

References

South African rugby union teams
Kimberley, Northern Cape
Sport in the Northern Cape
Griqualand West
1886 establishments in the Cape Colony